Selig is both a surname and given name, which means "blessed" in German and Yiddish. It may refer to:

Surname
Bud Selig (born 1934), American baseball administrator
Edith Selig (born 1960), French singer
Josh Selig (born 1964), American television producer
Martin Selig (born 1936), American businessman
Phineas Selig (1856–1941), New Zealand journalist
Rüdiger Selig (born 1989), German cyclist
Stefan M. Selig (born 1963), American banker
Wendy Selig-Prieb (born 1960), American businesswoman
William Nicholas Selig (1864–1948), American film producer
Zachary Selig (1949-2016), American artist

Given name
Edward Selig Salomon (1836–1913), American general
Selig Brodetsky (1888–1954), British mathematician, President of the Hebrew University of Jerusalem
Selig S. Harrison (born 1927), American writer
Selig Hecht (1892–1947), American physiologist 
Selig Mogulescu (1858–1914), American comedian
Selig Perlman (1888–1959), American historian

See also
Selig (disambiguation)
Seliger, Seeliger
Seligmann (disambiguation), Seligman (disambiguation)
Zelig (disambiguation)

References

German-language surnames
Yiddish-language surnames